Nothopegia castanaefolia is a species of plant in the family Anacardiaceae. It is endemic to the border between the states of Maharashtra and Karnataka in India.

References

castanaefolia
Flora of Maharashtra
Flora of Karnataka
Critically endangered plants
Taxonomy articles created by Polbot